Christo Albertyn Smith (1898–1956) was a South African botanist. He co-wrote a definitive dictionary of common names of South African plants, although it was only published after his death.

Education and career 
Smith was born in Boksburg, South Africa in 1898. He completed his BSc in 1920 at the University of Stellenbosch after which he worked as a high school biology teacher (1921 - 1924). He joined the professional staff of the Division of Plant Science of the National Herbarium in Pretoria in 1925 and became Botanical Liaison officer at the Kew Herbarium in London from 1928 - 1931. During his career he collected 4600 samples of flora including Crassulaceae, Fabaceae, Amaranthaceae, Vitaceae, Asteraceae, Celastraceae, Scrophulariaceae, Brassicaceae, Scilloideae, Oleaceae, Geraniaceae, Poaceae, Portulacaceae and Rutaceae, most of which were stored in Pretoria and Kew.

He retired from academia in 1931 and entered journalism. He worked as agricultural editor for the Natal Witness in Pietermaritzburg, South Africa.

He worked for the Department of State Information, South Africa from 1946 and was posted to Canberra, Australia as Information Officer in 1954.

He died in 1956 in Canberra, Australia.

Selected publications 
 Albizia gummifera Smith, C.A. Bulletin of Miscellaneous Information, Royal Gardens, Kew 1930(5): 218. 1930

Sources

References

External links 
 Smith, Christo Albertyn on JSTOR

20th-century South African botanists
Botanists with author abbreviations
1898 births
1956 deaths